Alfred Auguste Janniot (13 June 1889 – 18 July 1969) was a French Art Deco sculptor most active in the 1930s.

Biography
Janniot was educated at the École des Beaux-Arts, a pupil of Jean Antoine Injalbert, and was the winner of the 1919 Prix de Rome.  Under the influence of Antoine Bourdelle, most of Janniot's career was given to monumental and architectural sculpture.

In 1938 he became an officer in the Legion of Honor. From 1945 through 1959, he held the title of "Professor of Monumental Art" at the Beaux-Arts in Paris.

His extensive bas-reliefs on the Palais de la Porte Dorée in Paris – built in 1931 for the Paris Colonial Exposition – portray ships, oceans, and wildlife, including antelopes, elephants, zebras, and snakes. Janniot also contributed the gilded panel Paris and New York Joining Hands Above Figures of Poetry, Beauty and Elegance on the façade of the Maison Française, Rockefeller Center, circa 1930.

Other work 

 Legend of the Earth and Legend of the Sea reliefs on the southern facade of the Palais de Tokyo, Paris, 1937
 Fountain of the Sun, Place Masséna, Nice, completed 1957, removed in the 1970s and reinstalled in 2011
 decor for the ocean liner Normandie

References 

 Janniot commemorative website

External links
 

French architectural sculptors
Prix de Rome for sculpture
1889 births
1969 deaths
Officiers of the Légion d'honneur
Members of the Académie des beaux-arts
20th-century French sculptors
French male sculptors